Jiang Menglin (20 January 1886 – 1964), also known as Chiang Monlin, was a Chinese educator, writer, and politician. Between 1919 and 1927, he also served as the President of Peking University. He later became the president of National Chekiang University. In the early 1950s, he was head of the Joint Commission on Rural Reconstruction in Taiwan.

Biography
Jiang was born in Yuyao, Ningbo, Zhejiang Province on 20 January 1886. Jiang studied at Zhejiang Advanced College (浙江高等学堂; now Zhejiang University) in Hangzhou in 1903. In 1908, he went to America and studied at University of California, Berkeley. At first, he majored in agriculture, and then he turned to pedagogy.
Jiang obtained his Ph.D. from Columbia University under John Dewey's guidance.

Political career
Jiang served as the Minister of Education of the Republic of China from 1928-1930.

Jiang was the General Secretary of Executive Yuan of the Republic of China from 1945 to 1947.

He was also the Chairman of the Sino-American Joint Commission on Rural Reconstruction in the late 1940s and 1950s.

See also
 Land Reform Museum

Notes

References and further reading
 Monlin Chiang, Tides from the West: A Chinese Autobiography(New Haven: Yale University Press, 1945).
 

1886 births
1964 deaths
Zhejiang University alumni
Academic staff of Zhejiang University
Politicians from Ningbo
Educators from Ningbo
Academic staff of Peking University
Academic staff of the National Southwestern Associated University
Kuomintang politicians in Taiwan
Republic of China politicians from Zhejiang
Writers from Ningbo
Republic of China essayists
Presidents of Peking University
Presidents of Zhejiang University
Teachers College, Columbia University alumni
People from Yuyao
Taiwanese people from Zhejiang
Taiwanese Ministers of Agriculture
20th-century essayists